Herman Joseph Justin (April 7, 1859 to July 14, 1918) was born in Lafayette, Indiana. Justin's father's profession, cigar making, didn't suit H. J., so he moved to Texas in 1877 at the age of 18. First settling in Gainesville, Texas at a time when Indian raids from the Oklahoma Territory were just beginning to wane, Justin was first employed as a shoe repairman at a local Gainesville shop.

The town he chose for relocation was ideal for a boot maker. Burlington was not only on the Chisholm Trail near the crossing of the Red River, but also served as a supply headquarters for cowboys and ranchers. In Burlington, Joe met and married Annie Allen, and in 1889 moved south to Nocona, Texas with their first son, John. Although successful in Spanish Fort, Joe knew that the business environment in Nocona would be more promising due to the newly constructed Missouri-Kansas-Texas railway and expanded market capacity.

Once in Nocona and capitalizing on the larger market, Annie Justin, H.J.'s wife, developed a fit kit in the early 1890s, which included a tape measure and an instructions chart for taking one's measurements for a pair of custom fit boots. Cowboys carried the fit kits with them on their journeys, becoming Justin's first traveling sales force.

In 1908, sons John and Earl came to work for their father, and the company was renamed H.J. Justin and Sons. In 1910, the company doubled its production utilizing new technology, and Justin boots were sold to 26 states, Canada, Mexico, and Cuba for $11 a pair. H. J. Justin and Sons continued to expand until the elder Justin's death in 1918.

John and Earl took over the business after their father's death in 1918. In 1925, the brothers moved the company headquarters to Fort Worth, Texas to capitalize on that city's growth. John and Earl's sister, Enid Justin, knowing that father H. J. would have wanted the boot company to remain in Nocona, opened her own business, the Nocona Boot Company.  Thus began the legend of quality and craftsmanship from one of the most famous boot-making families in the world.

While Justin and Nocona have grown considerably since the early days in Burlington, the same principles passed down from H. J. to sons John and Earl and daughter Enid, still hold true. H.J. Justin said, "No boot shall ever bear the Justin brand unless it is the very best that can be produced from the standpoint of material, style and workmanship. It is my wish that I might leave behind me an institution which will uphold the standards and spirit of the true West."

References
 University of Texas Austin
 Justin Brands

External links
 Findagrave memorial for Herman Joseph Justin

1859 births
1918 deaths
People from Lafayette, Indiana
People from Gainesville, Texas
People from Montague County, Texas
People from Nocona, Texas